Duino-Aurisina (also) is a comune (municipality) in the Province of Trieste in the Italian region of Friuli-Venezia Giulia. Lying near the border with Slovenia, it has a substantial Slovene minority. It is named by the two major settlements, Duino (Devin) and Aurisina (Nabrežina).

Geography

Duino-Aurisina borders the following municipalities: Komen (Slovenia), Doberdò del Lago, Monfalcone, Sežana (Slovenia), Sgonico, Trieste.

Famous residents
Slovene writer Alojz Rebula was born in San Pelagio, while the Slovene poet Igo Gruden was born in Aurisina. The Slovenian economist Ivan Ples was born in Duino, where the composer Andrej Volarič also lived.

The poet Rainer Maria Rilke began his Duino Elegies while staying at Duino castle in 1912.

The physicist Ludwig Eduard Boltzmann spent his last year, 1906, in Duino.

Parishes
The municipality of Duino-Aurisina contains the frazioni (subdivisions, mainly villages and hamlets).  This list shows Italian names with Slovene names in brackets: Aurisina (until the rise of fascism Nabresina) (Nabrežina), Ceroglie (Cerovlje), Duino (Devin), Malchina (Mavhinje), Medeazza (Medja vas), Precenico (Prečnik), Prepotto (Praprot), San Pelagio (Šempolaj), San Giovanni di Duino (Štivan), Sistiana (Sesljan), Slivia (Slivno), Ternova Piccola (Trnovca), Villaggio del Pescatore (Ribiško naselje), Visogliano (Vižovlje), Aurisina S. Croce (Nabrežina Križ), Aurisina Cave (Nabrežina Kamnolomi), Aurisina Stazione (Nabrežina Postaja) and Aurisina Centro (Nabrežina).

Demographic evolution 
As of 31 December 2004, it had a population of 8,815 and an area of 45.2 km². According to the 1971 census, 37,5% of the population (mainly in and around Aurisina) belongs to the Slovene ethnic group and about 60% to the Italian ethnic group (mainly in Duino and Sistiana)

Gallery

Twin towns
  Buje, Croatia
  Ilirska Bistrica, Slovenia

See also
 Gorizia and Gradisca
 Julian March
 Karst Plateau
 Slovene Lands

References

External links

 www.comune.duino-aurisina.ts.it/
 Guide to Duino & Sistiana

Cities and towns in Friuli-Venezia Giulia
Regions of Europe with multiple official languages